Dryobiini is a tribe of beetles in the subfamily Cerambycinae, containing the following genera and species:

 Genus Anisotyma (monotypic)
 Anisotyma soteri Napp & Monne, 2009
 Genus Dryobius
 Dryobius sexnotatus Linsley, 1957
 Genus Ornithia
 Ornithia mexicana (Sturm, 1843)

References

Cerambycinae